Nizhnedolgovsky is a rural locality (a khutor) and the administrative center of Nizhnedolgovskoye Rural Settlement, Nekhayevsky District, Volgograd Oblast, Russia. The population was 530 as of 2010. There are 13 streets.

Geography 
Nizhnedolgovsky is located on the bank of the Tishanka River, on Kalach Upland, 22 km northwest of Nekhayevskaya (the district's administrative centre) by road. Fedosovsky is the nearest rural locality.

References 

Rural localities in Nekhayevsky District